

Villa O'Higgins is a small town in the Aysén Region of southern Chile, located 220 km south of Cochrane and 550 km south of Coyhaique. Founded in 1966 and named after the Chilean independence hero Bernardo O'Higgins, it is the capital of the O'Higgins commune of Capitán Prat Province.

Villa O'Higgins is connected to the rest of Chile by the Carretera Austral (Southern Highway) – the final 120 km of which were completed southwards from Puerto Yungay in 2000 – and is the gateway to the Southern Patagonian Ice Field.

Facilities
The town has an airport, several guesthouses and campsites, a radio station, and a number of shops and restaurants. In the summer (Dec-Feb) a regular boat service takes passengers from Villa O'Higgins across the O'Higgins / San Martín Lake to Candelario Mancilla, from where it is possible to cross the border into Argentina via a footpath (no road). In bad weather, the service can be suspended for many days.

Climate
Villa O'Higgins has an oceanic climate (Köppen Cfb) characterised by pleasant, though very windy, summers and chilly winters.

References

External links
Municipalidad de Villa O'Higgins (in Spanish)
Unofficial website containing information on the Commune of O'Higgins
Jorge Leon Cabello's Flickr photos

Geography of Aysén Region
Populated places in Capitán Prat Province